Geary Gravel is an American science fiction author and professional sign language interpreter. He lives in western Massachusetts and has written thirteen books.

Bibliography

Autumnworld Mosaic
The Alchemists (1984; nominated for Philip K. Dick Award for best novel)
The Pathfinders (1986) (sequel to Alchemists)

War of the Fading Worlds
A Key for the Nonesuch (1990)
Return of the Breakneck Boys (1991) (sequel to Nonesuch)

Hook
Hook: A Novel for Young Readers (1992) (novelization based on the Steven Spielberg Motion Picture)

Batman
Mask of the Phantasm (1993) (novelization based on Batman: Mask of the Phantasm)
Shadows of the Past (1993) (novelization based on Batman: The Animated Series)
Dual to the Death (1994) (Batman: The Animated Series)
The Dragon and the Bat (1994) (Batman: The Animated Series)
Batman and Mr. Freeze (1997) (A Golden Book)

Might and Magic
The Dreamwright (1995) (a Might and Magic novel)
The Shadowsmith (1996) (sequel to Dreamwright)

Edgar Rice Burroughs Universe
John Carter of Mars: Gods of the Forgotten (2021) (authorized sequel to the Mars series of Edgar Rice Burroughs)

External links

Geary Gravel at the SF Encyclopedia

Living people
American male novelists
American science fiction writers
Year of birth missing (living people)